Brahmanagama Grama Niladhari Division is a Grama Niladhari Division of the Homagama Divisional Secretariat  of Colombo District  of Western Province, Sri Lanka .  It has Grama Niladhari Division Code 500.

Brahmanagama is a surrounded by the Mattegoda East, Deepangoda, Niyandagala, Magammana West and Mambulgoda  Grama Niladhari Divisions.

Demographics

Ethnicity 

The Brahmanagama Grama Niladhari Division has a Sinhalese majority (98.1%) . In comparison, the Homagama Divisional Secretariat (which contains the Brahmanagama Grama Niladhari Division) has a Sinhalese majority (98.1%)

Religion 

The Brahmanagama Grama Niladhari Division has a Buddhist majority (95.8%) . In comparison, the Homagama Divisional Secretariat (which contains the Brahmanagama Grama Niladhari Division) has a Buddhist majority (96.2%)

Grama Niladhari Divisions of Homagama Divisional Secretariat

References